Rakhine Razawin, is an Arakanese (Rakhine) chronicle covering the history of Arakan. The surviving portions of the chronicle consist of 48 palm-leaf manuscript bundles (576 palm-leaves).

References

Bibliography
 

Burmese chronicles